The Savannah Coastal Refuges Complex administers seven wildlife refuges between Georgia and South Carolina. Over 56,000 acres (230 km2) of refuge land along a 100-mile coast line are administered by the complex.

The complex includes seven refuges:
Savannah National Wildlife Refuge - Established 1927
Wolf Island National Wildlife Refuge - Established 1930
Tybee National Wildlife Refuge - Established 1938
Blackbeard Island National Wildlife Refuge - Established 1940
Harris Neck National Wildlife Refuge - Established 1962
Wassaw National Wildlife Refuge - Established 1969
Pinckney Island National Wildlife Refuge - Established 1975

The Headquarters Office for Savannah Coastal Refuges Complex is located in Savannah, Georgia. The complex has a combined staff of 31 with a fiscal year 2005 budget of $3,582,000.

See also
List of National Wildlife Refuges

External links
Savannah Coastal Refuges Complex homepage

National Wildlife Refuges in Georgia (U.S. state)
National Wildlife Refuges in South Carolina